Burland is a surname. Notable people with the surname include:

Alan Burland (born 1952), Bermudian sailor
Brian Burland (1931–2010), Bermudian writer
Cottie Arthur Burland (1905–1983), British author and researcher
Dave Burland (born 1941), British folk singer and guitarist
John Burland (judge) (1724-1776), British lawyer and judge